The 2021 NCAA Division I women's soccer tournament was the 40th edition of the NCAA Division I Women's Soccer Tournament, a postseason tournament to determine the national champion of NCAA Division I women's college soccer. The College Cup was played on December 3 and December 6. It was originally set to be played in San Jose, California, but was moved to Stevens Stadium due to a conflict with the MLS playoffs schedule.

The Florida State Seminoles defeated the BYU Cougars on penalty kicks to win the national championship.

Qualification 

The tournament returned to 64 teams after only featuring 48 teams in the 2020 edition due to the COVID-19 pandemic.  The tournament also returns to the fall, after being held in the spring in 2020.  The tournament also returned to its normal format of having the higher seeds host matches until the College Cup.

All Division I women's soccer programs are eligible to qualify for the tournament. 28 teams received automatic bids by winning their conference tournaments, 3 teams received automatic bids by claiming the conference regular season crown (Ivy League, Pac-12 Conference, and West Coast Conference don't hold conference tournaments), and an additional 33 teams earned at-large bids based on their regular season records.

Bracket
The bracket was announced on Monday, November 8, 2021. First round games were played on November 12, 13 or 14 at campus sites.

Florida State Bracket

* Host institution

Schedule

First round

Second round

Round of 16

Quarterfinals 

Rankings from United Soccer Coaches Final Regular Season Rankings

Rutgers Bracket

* Host institution

Schedule

First round

Second round

Round of 16

Quarterfinals 

Rankings from United Soccer Coaches Final Regular Season Rankings

Duke Bracket

* Host institution

Schedule

First round

Second round

Round of 16

Quarterfinals 

Rankings from United Soccer Coaches Final Regular Season Rankings

Virginia Bracket

* Host institution

Schedule

First round

Second round

Round of 16

Quarterfinals 

Rankings from United Soccer Coaches Final Regular Season Rankings

College Cup

Schedule

Semi-finals

Final

Record by conference 

The R32, S16, E8, F4, CG, and NC columns indicate how many teams from each conference were in the Round of 32 (second round), Round of 16 (third round), Quarterfinals (Elite Eight), Semi-finals (Final Four), Championship Game, and National Champion, respectively.
The following conferences failed to place a team into the round of 32: America East, ASUN, Big Sky, Big South, C-USA, MAAC, MAC, Missouri Valley, Mountain West, Northeast, Ohio Valley, Patriot, Southland, The Summit, Sun Belt, SWAC, WAC. The conference's records have been consolidated in the other row.

Statistics

Goalscorers

References 

NCAA Division I Women's Soccer Championship
2021 NCAA Division I women's soccer season
NCAA Division I
Women's soccer in the United States
NCAA 2021
2021